Ziarat Shareef is a mosque with a madrasah (Madrasah khāṣah ( English: private school) in Kakrala city, Budaun district of Uttar Pradesh, India. The building was designed and built by Shah Saqlain Miyan. The building also contains the Khatoli Shareef of Shah Dargahi Miyan. People from across the country come to visit the Khatoli Shareef. This visit is called the ziyarat, hence the name of this building.

History
This madrasah is the oldest madrasah in Kakrala City. The main objective of the institution is to impart education to under-privileged students. This madrasah provides Islamic as well as modern education to students, who come from across northern India to pursue an Islamic education.

Geography
Ziarat Shareef is located at

References

Mosques in Uttar Pradesh
Budaun district